Linda Phillips may refer to:
 Linda Phillips (politician), member of the West Virginia House of Delegates
 Linda Phillips (musician), Australian composer, pianist and music critic
 Linda Gilbert Saucier, née Phillips, American mathematician and textbook author